D, also known as dlang, is a multi-paradigm system programming language created by Walter Bright at Digital Mars and released in 2001. Andrei Alexandrescu joined the design and development effort in 2007. Though it originated as a re-engineering of C++, D is a profoundly different language —features of D can be considered streamlined and expanded-upon ideas from C++, however D also draws inspiration from other high-level programming languages, notably Java, Python, Ruby, C#, and Eiffel.

D combines the performance and safety of compiled languages with the expressive power of modern dynamic and functional programming languages. Idiomatic D code is commonly as fast as equivalent C++ code, while also being shorter.  The language as a whole is not memory-safe but includes optional attributes designed to guarantee memory safety of either subsets of or the whole program.

Type inference, automatic memory management and syntactic sugar for common types allow faster development, while bounds checking and design by contract find bugs earlier at runtime, and a concurrency-aware type system catches bugs at compile time.

Features
D was designed with lessons learned from practical C++ usage, rather than from a purely theoretical perspective. Although the language uses many C and C++ concepts, it also discards some, or uses different approaches (and syntax) to achieve some goals. As such, it is not source compatible (nor does it aim to be) with C and C++ source code in general (some simpler code bases from these languages might by luck work with D, or require some porting). D has, however, been constrained in its design by the rule that any code that was legal in both C and D should behave in the same way.

D gained some features before C++, such as closures, anonymous functions, compile-time function execution, ranges, built-in container iteration concepts and type inference. D adds to the functionality of C++ by also implementing design by contract, unit testing, true modules, garbage collection, first class arrays, associative arrays, dynamic arrays, array slicing, nested functions, lazy evaluation, scoped (deferred) code execution, and a re-engineered template syntax. C++ multiple inheritance was replaced by Java-style single inheritance with interfaces and mixins. On the other hand, D's declaration, statement and expression syntax closely matches that of C++.

D retains C++'s ability to perform low-level programming including inline assembler, which typifies the differences between D and application languages like Java and C#. Inline assembler lets programmers enter machine-specific assembly code within standard D code, a method used by system programmers to access the low-level features of the processor needed to run programs that interface directly with the underlying hardware, such as operating systems and device drivers, as well as writing high-performance code (i.e. using vector extensions, SIMD) that is hard to generate by the compiler automatically.

D supports function overloading and operator overloading, as well as dynamic arrays and associative arrays by default. Symbols (functions, variables, classes) can be declared in any order - forward declarations are not required. Similarly imports can be done almost in any order, and even be scoped (i.e. import some module or part of it inside a function, class or unittest only). D has built-in support for documentation comments, allowing automatic documentation generation.

In D, text character strings are just arrays of characters, and arrays in D are bounds-checked, unlike those in C++. Specific operators for string handling exist, visually distinct from mathematical corellaries. D has first class types for complex and imaginary numbers, and evaluates expressions involving such types, efficiently.

Programming paradigms
D supports five main programming paradigms:
 concurrent (actor model)
 object-oriented
 imperative
 functional
 metaprogramming

Imperative
Imperative programming in D is almost identical to that in C. Functions, data, statements, declarations and expressions work just as they do in C, and the C runtime library may be accessed directly. On the other hand, some notable differences between D and C in the area of imperative programming include D's foreach loop construct, which allows looping over a collection, and nested functions, which are functions that are declared inside another and may access the enclosing function's local variables.

import std.stdio;

void main() {
    int multiplier = 10;
    int scaled(int x) { return x * multiplier; }

    foreach (i; 0 .. 10) {
        writefln("Hello, world %d! scaled = %d", i, scaled(i));
    }
}

Object-oriented
Object-oriented programming in D is based on a single inheritance hierarchy, with all classes derived from class Object. D does not support multiple inheritance; instead, it uses Java-style interfaces, which are comparable to C++'s pure abstract classes, and mixins, which separates common functionality from the inheritance hierarchy. D also allows the defining of static and final (non-virtual) methods in interfaces.

Interfaces and inheritance in D support covariant types for return types of overridden methods.

D supports type forwarding, as well as optional custom dynamic dispatch.

Classes (and interfaces) in D can contain invariants which are automatically checked before and after entry to public methods, in accordance with the design by contract methodology.

Many aspects of classes (and structs) can be introspected automatically at compile time (a form of reflection using type traits) and at run time (RTTI / TypeInfo), to facilitate generic code or automatic code generation (usually using compile-time techniques).

Functional
D supports functional programming features such as function literals, closures, recursively-immutable objects and the use of higher-order functions. There are two syntaxes for anonymous functions, including a multiple-statement form and a "shorthand" single-expression notation:

int function(int) g;
g = (x) { return x * x; }; // longhand
g = (x) => x * x;          // shorthand

There are two built-in types for function literals, function, which is simply a pointer to a stack-allocated function, and delegate, which also includes a pointer to the surrounding environment. Type inference may be used with an anonymous function, in which case the compiler creates a delegate unless it can prove that an environment pointer is not necessary. Likewise, to implement a closure, the compiler places enclosed local variables on the heap only if necessary (for example, if a closure is returned by another function, and exits that function's scope). When using type inference, the compiler will also add attributes such as pure and nothrow to a function's type, if it can prove that they apply.

Other functional features such as currying and common higher-order functions such as map, filter, and reduce are available through the standard library modules std.functional and std.algorithm.

import std.stdio, std.algorithm, std.range;

void main()
{
    int[] a1 = [0, 1, 2, 3, 4, 5, 6, 7, 8, 9];
    int[] a2 = [6, 7, 8, 9];

    // must be immutable to allow access from inside a pure function
    immutable pivot = 5;

    int mySum(int a, int b) pure nothrow // pure function
    {
        if (b <= pivot) // ref to enclosing-scope
            return a + b;
        else
            return a;
    }

    // passing a delegate (closure)
    auto result = reduce!mySum(chain(a1, a2));
    writeln("Result: ", result); // Result: 15

    // passing a delegate literal
    result = reduce!((a, b) => (b <= pivot) ? a + b : a)(chain(a1, a2));
    writeln("Result: ", result); // Result: 15
}

Alternatively, the above function compositions can be expressed using Uniform function call syntax (UFCS) for more natural left-to-right reading:

    auto result = a1.chain(a2).reduce!mySum();
    writeln("Result: ", result);

    result = a1.chain(a2).reduce!((a, b) => (b <= pivot) ? a + b : a)();
    writeln("Result: ", result);

Parallelism
Parallel programming concepts are implemented in the library, and do not require extra support from the compiler. However the D type system and compiler ensure that data sharing can be detected and managed transparently.

import std.stdio : writeln;
import std.range : iota;
import std.parallelism : parallel;

void main()
{
    foreach (i; iota(11).parallel) {
        // The body of the foreach loop is executed in parallel for each i
        writeln("processing ", i);
    }
}

iota(11).parallel is equivalent to std.parallelism.parallel(iota(11)) by using UFCS.

The same module also supports taskPool which can be used for dynamic creation of parallel tasks, as well as map-filter-reduce and fold style operations on ranges (and arrays), which is useful when combined with functional operations. std.algorithm.map returns a lazily evaluated range rather than an array. This way, the elements are computed by each worker task in parallel automatically.

import std.stdio : writeln;
import std.algorithm : map;
import std.range : iota;
import std.parallelism : taskPool;

/* On Intel i7-3930X and gdc 9.3.0:
 * 5140ms using std.algorithm.reduce
 * 888ms using std.parallelism.taskPool.reduce
 *
 * On AMD Threadripper 2950X, and gdc 9.3.0:
 * 2864ms using std.algorithm.reduce
 * 95ms using std.parallelism.taskPool.reduce
 */
void main()
{
  auto nums = iota(1.0, 1_000_000_000.0);

  auto x = taskPool.reduce!"a + b"(
      0.0, map!"1.0 / (a * a)"(nums)
  );

  writeln("Sum: ", x);
}

Concurrency
Concurrency is fully implemented in the library, and it does not require support from the compiler. Alternative implementations and methodologies of writing concurrent code are possible. The use of D typing system does help ensure memory safety.

import std.stdio, std.concurrency, std.variant;

void foo()
{
    bool cont = true;

    while (cont)
    {
        receive( // Delegates are used to match the message type.
            (int msg) => writeln("int received: ", msg),
            (Tid sender) { cont = false; sender.send(-1); },
            (Variant v) => writeln("huh?") // Variant matches any type
        );
    }
}

void main()
{
    auto tid = spawn(&foo); // spawn a new thread running foo()

    foreach (i; 0 .. 10)
        tid.send(i);   // send some integers

    tid.send(1.0f);    // send a float
    tid.send("hello"); // send a string
    tid.send(thisTid); // send a struct (Tid)

    receive((int x) => writeln("Main thread received message: ", x));
}

Metaprogramming
Metaprogramming is supported through templates, compile-time function execution, tuples, and string mixins. The following examples demonstrate some of D's compile-time features.

Templates in D can be written in a more imperative style compared to the C++ functional style for templates. This is a regular function that calculates the factorial of a number:

ulong factorial(ulong n) {
    if (n < 2)
        return 1;
    else
        return n * factorial(n-1);
}

Here, the use of static if, D's compile-time conditional construct, is demonstrated to construct a template that performs the same calculation using code that is similar to that of the function above:

template Factorial(ulong n) {
    static if (n < 2)
        enum Factorial = 1;
    else
        enum Factorial = n * Factorial!(n-1);
}

In the following two examples, the template and function defined above are used to compute factorials. The types of constants need not be specified explicitly as the compiler infers their types from the right-hand sides of assignments:

enum fact_7 = Factorial!(7);

This is an example of compile-time function execution (CTFE). Ordinary functions may be used in constant, compile-time expressions provided they meet certain criteria:

enum fact_9 = factorial(9);

The std.string.format function performs printf-like data formatting (also at compile-time, through CTFE), and the "msg" pragma displays the result at compile time:

import std.string : format;
pragma(msg, format("7! = %s", fact_7));
pragma(msg, format("9! = %s", fact_9));

String mixins, combined with compile-time function execution, allow for the generation of D code using string operations at compile time. This can be used to parse domain-specific languages, which will be compiled as part of the program:

import FooToD; // hypothetical module which contains a function that parses Foo source code
               // and returns equivalent D code
void main() {
    mixin(fooToD(import("example.foo")));
}

Memory management
Memory is usually managed with garbage collection, but specific objects may be finalized immediately when they go out of scope. This is what the majority of programs and libraries written in D use.

In case more control over memory layout and better performance is needed, explicit memory management is possible using the overloaded operators new and delete, by calling C's malloc and free directly, or implementing custom allocator schemes (i.e. on stack with fallback, RAII style allocation, reference counting, shared reference counting). Garbage collection can be controlled: programmers may add and exclude memory ranges from being observed by the collector, can disable and enable the collector and force either a generational or full collection cycle. The manual gives many examples of how to implement different highly optimized memory management schemes for when garbage collection is inadequate in a program.

In functions, struct instances are by default allocated on the stack, while class instances by default allocated on the heap (with only reference to the class instance being on the stack). However this can be changed for classes, for example using standard library template std.typecons.scoped, or by using new for structs and assigning to a pointer instead of a value-based variable.

In functions, static arrays (of known size) are allocated on the stack. For dynamic arrays, one can use the core.stdc.stdlib.alloca function (similar to alloca in C), to allocate memory on the stack. The returned pointer can be used (recast) into a (typed) dynamic array, by means of a slice (however resizing array, including appending must be avoided; and for obvious reasons they must not be returned from the function).

A scope keyword can be used both to annotate parts of code, but also variables and classes/structs, to indicate they should be destroyed (destructor called) immediately on scope exit. Whatever the memory is deallocated also depends on implementation and class-vs-struct differences.

std.experimental.allocator contains a modular and composable allocator templates, to create custom high performance allocators for special use cases.

SafeD
SafeD
is the name given to the subset of D that can be guaranteed to be memory safe (no writes to memory that has not been allocated or that has been recycled). Functions marked @safe are checked at compile time to ensure that they do not use any features that could result in corruption of memory, such as pointer arithmetic and unchecked casts, and any other functions called must also be marked as @safe or @trusted. Functions can be marked @trusted for the cases where the compiler cannot distinguish between safe use of a feature that is disabled in SafeD and a potential case of memory corruption.

Scope lifetime safety
Initially under the banners of DIP1000 and DIP25 (now part of the language specification), D provides protections against certain ill-formed constructions involving the lifetimes of data.

The current mechanisms in place primarily deal with function parameters and stack memory however it is a stated ambition of the leadership of the programming language to provide a more thorough treatment of lifetimes within the D programming language (influenced by ideas from Rust programming language).

Lifetime safety of assignments
Within @safe code, the lifetime of an assignment involving a reference type is checked to ensure that the lifetime of the assignee is longer than that of the assigned.

For example:
@safe void test()
{
    int tmp = 0; // #1
    int* rad;    // #2
    rad = &tmp;  // If the order of the declarations of #1 and #2 is reversed, this fails.
    {
    	int bad = 45; // Lifetime of "bad" only extends to the scope in which it is defined.
        *rad = bad;   // This is kosher.
        rad = &bad;   // Lifetime of rad longer than bad, hence this is not kosher at all.
    }
}

Function parameter lifetime annotations within @safe code
When applied to function parameter which are either of pointer type or references, the keywords return and scope constrain the lifetime and use of that parameter.

The language standard dictates the following behaviour:

An annotated example is given below.@safe:

int* gp;
void thorin(scope int*);
void gloin(int*);
int* balin(return scope int* p, scope int* q, int* r)
{
     gp = p; // error, p escapes to global gp
     gp = q; // error, q escapes to global gp
     gp = r; // ok

     thorin(p); // ok, p does not escape thorin()
     thorin(q); // ok
     thorin(r); // ok

     gloin(p); // error, gloin() escapes p
     gloin(q); // error, gloin() escapes q
     gloin(r); // ok that gloin() escapes r

     return p; // ok
     return q; // error, cannot return 'scope' q
     return r; // ok
}

Interaction with other systems
C's application binary interface (ABI) is supported, as well as all of C's fundamental and derived types, enabling direct access to existing C code and libraries. D bindings are available for many popular C libraries. Additionally, C's standard library is part of standard D.

On Microsoft Windows, D can access Component Object Model (COM) code.

As long as memory management is properly taken care of, many other languages can be mixed with D in a single binary. For example, GDC compiler allow to link C, C++, and other supported language codes to be intermixed. D code (functions) can also be marked as using C, C++, Pascal ABIs, and thus be passed to the libraries written in these languages as callbacks. Similarly data can be interchanged between the codes written in these languages in both ways. This usually restricts use to primitive types, pointers, some forms of arrays, unions, structs, and only some types of function pointers.

Because many other programming languages often provide the C API for writing extensions or running the interpreter of the languages, D can interface directly with these languages as well, using standard C bindings (with a thin D interface file). For example, there are bi-directional bindings for languages like Python, Lua and other languages, often using compile-time code generation and compile-time type reflection methods.

Interaction with C++ code
D takes a permissive but realistic approach to interoperation with C++ code.

For D code marked as extern(C++), the following features are specified:

 The name mangling conventions shall match those of C++ on the target.
 For function calls, the ABI shall be equivalent.
 The vtable shall be matched up to single inheritance (the only level supported by the D language specification).

C++ namespaces are used via the syntax extern(C++, namespace) where namespace is the name of the C++ namespace.

An example of C++ interoperation
The C++ side
#include <iostream>
using namespace std;
class Base
{
    public:
        virtual void print3i(int a, int b, int c) = 0;
};

class Derived : public Base
{
    public:
        int field;
        Derived(int field) : field(field) {}

        void print3i(int a, int b, int c)
        {
            cout << "a = " << a << endl;
            cout << "b = " << b << endl;
            cout << "c = " << c << endl;
        }

        int mul(int factor);
};

int Derived::mul(int factor)
{
    return field * factor;
}

Derived *createInstance(int i)
{
    return new Derived(i);
}

void deleteInstance(Derived *&d)
{
    delete d;
    d = 0;
}

The D side
extern(C++)
{
    abstract class Base
    {
        void print3i(int a, int b, int c);
    }

    class Derived : Base
    {
        int field;
        @disable this();
        override void print3i(int a, int b, int c);
        final int mul(int factor);
    }

    Derived createInstance(int i);
    void deleteInstance(ref Derived d);
}

void main()
{
    import std.stdio;

    auto d1 = createInstance(5);
    writeln(d1.field);
    writeln(d1.mul(4));

    Base b1 = d1;
    b1.print3i(1, 2, 3);

    deleteInstance(d1);
    assert(d1 is null);

    auto d2 = createInstance(42);
    writeln(d2.field);

    deleteInstance(d2);
    assert(d2 is null);
}

Better C
The D programming language has an official subset known as "". This subset forbids access to D features requiring use of runtime libraries other than that of C.

Enabled via the compiler flags "-betterC" on DMD and LDC, and "-fno-druntime" on GDC,  may only call into D code compiled under the same flag (and linked code other than D) but code compiled without the  option may call into code compiled with it: this will, however, lead to slightly different behaviours due to differences in how C and D handle asserts.

Features included in Better C
 Unrestricted use of compile-time features (for example, D's dynamic allocation features can be used at compile time to pre-allocate D data)
 Full metaprogramming facilities
 Nested functions, nested structs, delegates and lambdas
 Member functions, constructors, destructors, operating overloading, etc.
 The full module system
 Array slicing, and array bounds checking
 RAII
 
 Memory safety protections
 Interfacing with C++
 COM classes and C++ classes
 assert failures are directed to the C runtime library
 switch with strings
 final switch
 unittest blocks
 printf format validation

Features excluded from Better C
 Garbage collection
 TypeInfo and ModuleInfo
 Built-in threading (e.g. core.thread)
 Dynamic arrays (though slices of static arrays work) and associative arrays
 Exceptions
 synchronized and core.sync
 Static module constructors or destructors

History
Walter Bright started working on a new language in 1999. D was first released in December 2001 and reached version 1.0 in January 2007. The first version of the language (D1) concentrated on the imperative, object oriented and metaprogramming paradigms, similar to C++.

Some members of the D community dissatisfied with Phobos, D's official runtime and standard library, created an alternative runtime and standard library named Tango. The first public Tango announcement came within days of D 1.0's release. Tango adopted a different programming style, embracing OOP and high modularity. Being a community-led project, Tango was more open to contributions, which allowed it to progress faster than the official standard library. At that time, Tango and Phobos were incompatible due to different runtime support APIs (the garbage collector, threading support, etc.). This made it impossible to use both libraries in the same project. The existence of two libraries, both widely in use, has led to significant dispute due to some packages using Phobos and others using Tango.

In June 2007, the first version of D2 was released. The beginning of D2's development signaled D1's stabilization. The first version of the language has been placed in maintenance, only receiving corrections and implementation bugfixes. D2 introduced breaking changes to the language, beginning with its first experimental const system. D2 later added numerous other language features, such as closures, purity, and support for the functional and concurrent programming paradigms. D2 also solved standard library problems by separating the runtime from the standard library. The completion of a D2 Tango port was announced in February 2012.

The release of Andrei Alexandrescu's book The D Programming Language on 12 June 2010, marked the stabilization of D2, which today is commonly referred to as just "D".

In January 2011, D development moved from a bugtracker / patch-submission basis to GitHub. This has led to a significant increase in contributions to the compiler, runtime and standard library.

In December 2011, Andrei Alexandrescu announced that D1, the first version of the language, would be discontinued on 31 December 2012. The final D1 release, D v1.076, was on 31 December 2012.

Code for the official D compiler, the Digital Mars D compiler by Walter Bright, was originally released under a custom license, qualifying as source available but not conforming to the Open Source Definition. In 2014, the compiler front-end was re-licensed as open source under the Boost Software License. This re-licensed code excluded the back-end, which had been partially developed at Symantec. On 7 April 2017, the whole compiler was made available under the Boost license after Symantec gave permission to re-license the back-end, too. On 21 June 2017, the D Language was accepted for inclusion in GCC.

Implementations
Most current D implementations compile directly into machine code for efficient execution.

Production ready compilers:

 DMD – The Digital Mars D compiler by Walter Bright is the official D compiler; open sourced under the Boost Software License. The DMD frontend is shared by GDC (now in GCC) and LDC, to improve compatibility between compilers. Initially the frontend was written in C++, but now most of it is now written in D itself (self-hosting). The backend and machine code optimizers are based on the Symantec compiler. At first it supported only 32-bit x86, with support added for 64-bit amd64 and PowerPC by Walter Bright. Later the backend and almost the entire compiler was ported from C++ to D for full self-hosting.
 GCC – The GNU Compiler Collection, merged GDC into GCC 9 on 29 October 2018. The first working versions of GDC with GCC, based on GCC 3.3 and GCC 3.4 on 32-bit x86 on Linux and macOS was released on 22 March 2004. Since then GDC has gained support for additional platforms, improved performance, and fixed bugs, while tracking upstream DMD code for the frontend and language specification.
 LDC – A compiler based on the DMD front-end that uses LLVM as its compiler back-end. The first release-quality version was published on 9 January 2009. It supports version 2.0.

Toy and proof-of-concept compilers:
 D Compiler for  – A back-end for the D programming language 2.0 compiler. It compiles the code to Common Intermediate Language (CIL) bytecode rather than to machine code. The CIL can then be run via a Common Language Infrastructure (CLI) virtual machine. The project has not been updated in years and the author indicated the project is not active anymore.
 SDC – The Stupid D Compiler uses a custom front-end and LLVM as its compiler back-end. It is written in D and uses a scheduler to handle symbol resolution in order to elegantly handle the compile-time features of D. This compiler currently supports a limited subset of the language.

Using above compilers and toolchains, it is possible to compile D programs to target many different architectures, including x86, amd64, AArch64, PowerPC, MIPS64, DEC Alpha, Motorola m68k, Sparc, s390, WebAssembly. The primary supported operating systems are Windows and Linux, but various compilers also support Mac OS X, FreeBSD, NetBSD, AIX, Solaris/OpenSolaris and Android, either as a host or target, or both. WebAssembly target (supported via LDC and LLVM) can operate in any WebAssembly environment, like modern web browser (Google Chrome, Mozilla Firefox, Microsoft Edge, Apple Safari), or dedicated Wasm virtual machines.

Development tools
Editors and integrated development environments (IDEs) supporting syntax highlighting and partial code completion for the language include SlickEdit, Emacs, vim, SciTE, Smultron, Zeus, and Geany among others.

 Dexed (formerly Coedit), a D focused graphical IDE written in Object Pascal
 Mono-D is a feature rich cross-platform D focused graphical IDE based on MonoDevelop / Xamarin Studio, mainly written in C Sharp.
 Eclipse plug-ins for D include DDT and Descent (dead project).
 Visual Studio integration is provided by VisualD.
 Visual Studio Code integration with extensions as Dlang-Vscode or Code-D.
 A bundle is available for TextMate, and the Code::Blocks IDE includes partial support for the language. However, standard IDE features such as code completion or refactoring are not yet available, though they do work partially in Code::Blocks (due to D's similarity to C).
 The Xcode 3 plugin "D for Xcode" enables D-based projects and development.
 KDevelop (as well as its text editor backend, Kate) autocompletion plugin is available.

Open source D IDEs for Windows exist, some written in D, such as Poseidon, D-IDE, and Entice Designer.

D applications can be debugged using any C/C++ debugger, like GDB or WinDbg, although support for various D-specific language features is extremely limited. On Windows, D programs can be debugged using Ddbg, or Microsoft debugging tools (WinDBG and Visual Studio), after having converted the debug information using cv2pdb. The ZeroBUGS debugger for Linux has experimental support for the D language. Ddbg can be used with various IDEs or from the command line; ZeroBUGS has its own graphical user interface (GUI).

DustMite is a powerful tool for minimizing D source code, useful when finding compiler or tests issues.

dub is a popular package and build manager for D applications and libraries, and is often integrated into IDE support.

Examples

Example 1
This example program prints its command line arguments. The main function is the entry point of a D program, and args is an array of strings representing the command line arguments. A string in D is an array of characters, represented by immutable(char)[].

import std.stdio: writefln;

void main(string[] args) {
    foreach (i, arg; args)
        writefln("args[%d] = '%s'", i, arg);
}

The foreach statement can iterate over any collection. In this case, it is producing a sequence of indexes (i) and values (arg) from the array args. The index i and the value arg have their types inferred from the type of the array args.

Example 2
The following shows several D capabilities and D design trade-offs in a short program. It iterates over the lines of a text file named words.txt, which contains a different word on each line, and prints all the words that are anagrams of other words.

import std.stdio, std.algorithm, std.range, std.string;

void main() {
    dstring[] [dstring] signature2words;

    foreach (dchar[] w; lines(File("words.txt"))) {
        w = w.chomp().toLower();
        immutable signature = w.dup.sort().release().idup;
        signature2words[signature] ~= w.idup;
    }

    foreach (words; signature2words) {
        if (words.length > 1) {
            writeln(words.join(" "));
        }
    }
}

 signature2words is a built-in associative array that maps dstring (32-bit / char) keys to arrays of dstrings. It is similar to defaultdict(list) in Python.
 lines(File()) yields lines lazily, with the newline. It has to then be copied with idup to obtain a string to be used for the associative array values (the idup property of arrays returns an immutable duplicate of the array, which is required since the dstring type is actually immutable(dchar)[]). Built-in associative arrays require immutable keys.
 The ~= operator appends a new dstring to the values of the associate dynamic array.
 toLower, join and chomp are string functions that D allows the use of with a method syntax. The name of such functions are often similar to Python string methods. The toLower converts a string to lower case, join(" ") joins an array of strings into a single string using a single space as separator, and chomp removes a newline from the end of the string if one is present. The w.dup.sort().release().idup is more readable, but equivalent to release(sort(w.dup)).idup for example. This feature is called UFCS (Uniform Function Call Syntax), and allows extending any built-in or third party package types with method-like functionality. The style of writing code like this is often referenced as pipeline (especially when the objects used are lazily computed, for example iterators / ranges) or Fluent interface.
 The sort is an std.algorithm function that sorts the array in place, creating a unique signature for words that are anagrams of each other. The release() method on the return value of sort() is handy to keep the code as a single expression.
 The second foreach iterates on the values of the associative array, it is able to infer the type of words.
 signature is assigned to an immutable variable, its type is inferred.
 UTF-32 dchar[] is used instead of normal UTF-8 char[] otherwise sort() refuses to sort it. There are more efficient ways to write this program using just UTF-8.

Uses
Notable organisations that use the D programming language for projects include Facebook, eBay, and Netflix.

D has been successfully used for AAA games, language interpreters, virtual machines, an operating system kernel, GPU programming, web development, numerical analysis, GUI applications, a passenger information system, machine learning, text processing, web and application servers and research.

See also

 Ddoc
 D Language Foundation

References

Further reading
 
 
 
  (distributed under CC-BY-NC-SA license). This book teaches programming to novices, but covers many advanced D topics as well.

External links

 
 Digital Mars
 Turkish Forum
 

Programming languages
C programming language family
Class-based programming languages
Cross-platform software
Free compilers and interpreters
High-level programming languages
Multi-paradigm programming languages
Object-oriented programming languages
Procedural programming languages
Programming languages created in 2001
Statically typed programming languages
Systems programming languages
2001 software
Software using the Boost license
Articles with example D code